Frankie DeBusk is a former American football player and coach. He served as the head football coach at Tusculum University in Greeneville, Tennessee, from 1998 to 2015.

As a college football player, DeBusk was starting quarterback for the Furman Paladins, where he was a member of the 1988 Furman Paladins football team, which defeated the Georgie Southern Eagles in the 1988 NCAA Division I-AA Football Championship Game.

He coached Terrell Owens while at the University of Tennessee at Chattanooga.

References

Year of birth missing (living people)
Living people
American football quarterbacks
Furman Paladins football players
Tusculum Pioneers football coaches